Sadul Shahar railway station is a railway station in Shri Ganganagar district, Rajasthan. Its code is SDS. It serves Sadul Shahar town. The station consists of 2 platforms. Passenger, Express, and Superfast trains halt here.

Trains

The following trains halt at Sadul Shahar railway station in both directions:

 Firozpur Cantonment–Shri Ganganagar Express
 Kota–Shri Ganganagar Superfast Express
 Hazur Sahib Nanded–Shri Ganganagar Express
Amrapur Aravali Express

References

Railway stations in Sri Ganganagar district
Bikaner railway division